Jack Villatoro (born November 14, 2001) is an American soccer player who most recently played as a defender for San Diego 1904 in the NISA.

References

2001 births
Living people
Sportspeople from Fairfax, Virginia
Soccer players from Alexandria, Virginia
American soccer players
Association football defenders
Loudoun United FC players
USL Championship players
National Independent Soccer Association players
American sportspeople of Salvadoran descent
American sportspeople of Peruvian descent
Citizens of Peru through descent
Peruvian footballers